Briefadel (in German) or brevadel (in Danish, Norwegian, and Swedish) are persons and families who have been ennobled by letters patent. The oldest known such letters patent were issued in the middle of the 14th century, during the Late Middle Ages. 

Briefadel can be contrasted with Uradel, whose nobility predates issuance of letters patent. The term dates to the early nineteenth century.

See also 
 Austrian nobility
 Danish nobility
 Finnish nobility
 German nobility
 Icelandic nobility
 Norwegian nobility
 Swedish nobility

References

Danish nobility
German noble titles
Norwegian nobility
Swedish nobility
Austrian noble titles